Zhiben is a railway station on the Taiwan Railways Administration South-link line located in Taitung City, Taitung County, Taiwan.

History
The station was opened on 15 July 1985.

Around the station
 Zhiben Wetlands

See also
 List of railway stations in Taiwan

References

1985 establishments in Taiwan
Railway stations in Taitung County
Railway stations opened in 1985
Railway stations served by Taiwan Railways Administration